Fair Weather is album by American banjoist Alison Brown, released in 2000.

At the 43rd Grammy Awards Brown and Béla Fleck won the Grammy Award for Best Country Instrumental Performance for "Leaving Cottondale".

Guests include Stuart Duncan, Darol Anger, Vince Gill and Tony Rice.

Reception 

In his Allmusic review, music critic Rick Anderson wrote that Brown "returns to her bluegrass roots on this beautiful and exhilarating album. Well, sort of... much of this is bluegrass music of a type that Bill Monroe might not recognize... The album's most thrilling moments come on the complex and exhilarating "Leaving Cottondale," which is both one of the prettiest and one of the most technically impressive of Brown's compositions. Here she's joined by fellow banjo maverick Bela Fleck for one of the most jaw-dropping passages of twin-banjo counterpoint ever put on tape. Call it bluegrass, call it newgrass, call it jazzgrass, whatever. This is one of the best albums of 2000 in any genre."

Ian Perry of Banjo NewsLetter writes of the title track "Fair Weather was written by Steve Libbea (brother of Nashville Bluegrass Band bassist Gene Libbea), who died tragically in a plane crash. Alison, along with vocalist Vince Gill and Gene Libbea who also appear on the cut, offer this version of Steve’s song as a tribute, making the whole performance that much more heartfelt and meaningful."

Chet Williamson of Rambles.net writes "The music is great, from the blazing hot opener, "Late on Arrival," to "Sweet Thing," the banjo solo that wraps things up. There are a lot of highlights in between. The title track is a Vince Gill showcase, proving that he can still play mighty fine lead guitar as well as sing magnificently."

Track listing

Track information taken from the album's liner notes.

Personnel
 Alison Brown – banjo, guitar
 Béla Fleck – banjo
 John Burr – piano, keyboards
 Rick Reed – drums
 Garry West – bass
 Sam Bush – mandolin, lead vocal (4)
 Stuart Duncan – fiddle
 Darol Anger – fiddle
 Garth Fundis – vocals
 Vince Gill – guitar, vocals
 David Grier – guitar
 Tim O'Brien – mandolin, lead vocal (8)
 Tony Rice – guitar
 Mike Marshall – guitar, mandolin
 Todd Phillips – bass
 Missy Raines – bass

References

External links
Alison Brown Official Site
Compass Records Official Site

2000 albums
Alison Brown albums